Tantauco Park (Spanish: Parque Tantauco) is a  private natural reserve on the south end of Chiloé Island in Chile. The park was created by Chilean business magnate and later President of Chile Sebastián Piñera in 2005 in order to protect 118,000 hectares of the region's unique ecosystem. Piñera owns the foundation Fundación Cultura y Sociedad (formerly Fundación Futuro), which runs the park. The park is open to the public with two campgrounds and a  network of hiking trails.

Tantauco Park is an attractive ecotourist destination due to the remarkable biodiversity of its nearly untouched Valdivian temperate rainforest and the rather easy public access. Precipitations in the area average about  annually.

Some of the endangered species that can be seen in the park include Guaitecas cypress, Huillín otter, Chilote fox and the Blue whale

External links
  Tantauco Park Official Website
  Map of the park boundaries

Protected areas of Los Lagos Region
Parks in Chile
Chiloé Archipelago
Piñera family
Protected areas established in 2005
2005 establishments in Chile
Valdivian temperate rainforest